Bigfoot: The Unforgettable Encounter is a 1995 American independent family film about the legendary creature Bigfoot and a young boy he befriends. The film was written and directed by Corey Michael Eubanks and stars Zachery Ty Bryan as the young boy Cody and Gary Maloncon as Bigfoot.

Plot

A young boy named Cody Higgins (Zachery Ty Bryan) lives in the Pacific Northwest. One day, he develops a friendship with the legendary Bigfoot. He must now race to save his new friend when a greedy multi-millioner named Chaz Frederick (David Rasche) places a bounty on Bigfoot enough for 500 hunters, 50 park rangers, and an.ambitious scientist named Samantha (Crystal Chappell) to swarm the forest looking for it.

Cast
 Matt McCoy as Park Ranger Nick Clifton
 David Rasche as Chaz Frederick
 Zachery Ty Bryan as Cody Higgins
 Crystal Chappell as Samantha
 JoJo Adams as Ben
 Brian Avery as Zackery
 Derek Barton as TV Talk Show Host
 Douglas Bennett as Walter
 Michael Buice as Hal
 Liam Day as Newscaster
 Erika Rosander as Skier
 Gary Maloncon as Bigfoot
 Kelly Kenneally as Bigfoot
 Eddie Frierson as Bigfoot Vocal Effects (voice)
 Clay M. Lilley as Vester
 Clint Howard as Gary
 Darrell Mapson as Park Ranger Voss
 Joel Gayner as Artist
 Rance Howard as Todd Brandell
 Rif Hutton as Jess
 Neal Matarazzo as Sheldon
 Janice Lynde as Betty
 Dennis Singletary as Booker
 Alan Wilder as Vern Vendor
 Tohoru Masamune as Ling
 Robert Orrison as Joe Perkins
 David Rowden as Dubow
 Russell Solberg as Stringer
 George O'Mara as Lee
 Neil Summers as Delbert
 Douglas Bennett as Walter
 Mark Kriski as Newsman
 John Molo as Architect
 Jessica Swan as Customer
 Jerry Spicer as reporter #4
 Debbie James as Misty Vales
 Ingo Neuhaus as Boris

Reception
Audiences on Rotten Tomatoes give the film a 38% rating, based on 37 reviews, with an average rating of 2.6/5. The New York Times critic Sandra Brennan writes: "This action-packed outdoor adventure was designed especially for young children."

Release
The film was distributed by Republic Pictures Home Video in 1995.

References

External links
 

1995 films
American independent films
1995 independent films
Bigfoot films
DHX Media films
1990s English-language films
1990s American films